Guaranteed is the ninth studio album by the British musical group Level 42, released in 1991, their first album of the 1990s. The album was released by RCA records and it was the first Level 42 studio album released by a label other than Polydor.

Overview

Guaranteed was the first Level 42 album without a songwriting contribution from former member Boon Gould, who had contributed lyrics to some songs for the 1988 album Staring at the Sun following his departure from the band. Several songs were co-written with lyricists Drew Barfield and George M. Green. Guaranteed was also the first Level 42 album to be released following the death of guitarist Alan Murphy, who had taken over from Gould for Staring at the Sun and related tours.

The lineup credits for the album listed all of the musicians involved rather than clearly defining the separation between band and guest players. This reflected the ongoing personnel shifts within the band. All cover art and inlay photos implied that the band consisted of Mark King, Mike Lindup and Gary Husband plus a guitarist, but it was less clear on the latter's identity — inlay photos featured Allan Holdsworth while cover artwork featured Jakko Jakszyk. In practice Holdsworth, who had played with the band during its recent London residency at the Hammersmith Apollo, provided electric guitar solos to only five of the album's songs in the studio: "Seven Years", "A Kinder Eye", "She Can't Help Herself", "If You Were Mine" and "With A Little Love". Band associate Dominic Miller contributed all rhythm guitar work, as he had done for Staring at the Sun. Jakszyk (formerly with 64 Spoons and a top session guitarist) played no part in recording the album, but was hired for touring and promotional work, was featured in the album artwork and in the promotional video clips for "Guaranteed", "Overtime" and "My Father's Shoes".

Due to Lindup's absence from many of the sessions, a high proportion of the keyboard parts for Guaranteed were played by drummer Gary Husband (including the piano solo on "Her Big Day") although Lindup would later overdub solos. Husband would also expand his songwriting contribution, including writing the song "If You Were Mine" on his own. Husband would leave Level 42 following this album, to be replaced by the band's original drummer Phil Gould, although he would return to the band in 1999.

The album's title track reached number 17 in the UK Singles Chart in 1991 and had two versions of its music video produced. The song "A Kinder Eye" was dedicated to the memory of Frances Robblee, the mother-in-law of lyricist George M. Green.

Track listing
 "Guaranteed" (Lindup, Husband, King, Badarou) – 4:51
 "Overtime" (Lindup, King, Barfield) – 4:47
 "Her Big Day" (Lindup, Husband, King, Barfield, Badarou) – 5:09
 "Seven Years" (King) – 4:42
 "Set Me Up" (Lindup, King, Barfield) – 4:28
 "The Ape" (King, Green) – 4:17
 "My Father's Shoes" (Lindup, King, Green, Badarou) – 5:14
 "A Kinder Eye" (King, Green) – 5:45
 "She Can't Help Herself" (Lindup, King, Barfield) – 5:00
 "If You Were Mine" (Husband) – 5:01
 "Lasso the Moon" (Lindup, Green) – 4:02
 "With a Little Love" (Husband, King) – 4:07

Personnel 

Level 42
 Mark King – vocals, bass
 Mike Lindup – vocals, keyboards
 Gary Husband – keyboards, drums, backing vocals

Additional musicians
 Wally Badarou – keyboards, backing vocals
 Dominic Miller – guitars
 Jakko Jakszyk – guitars (live)
 Allan Holdsworth – guitar solos (4, 8, 9, 10, 12)
 Gary Barnacle – saxophones
 John Thirkell – trumpets
 Annie McCaig – backing vocals

Production 
 Level 42 – producers, recording
 Wally Badarou – producer, recording 
 Tom Lord-Alge – mixing 
 Paul Crockford – management 
 Phillippa Watson – management

Charts
Album

Singles

External links
 Level 42 official website

References

1991 albums
Level 42 albums
Albums produced by Wally Badarou
RCA Records albums